Sofronis Avgousti, (born 9 March 1977) is a Cypriot football manager and former player who played as a goalkeeper for the Cypriot national team. He is the current manager of Omonia.

Playing career
He started his career in 1998 with Apollon Limassol before joining AEK Larnaca in 2006. After another spell with Apollon in 2008–09, he split the 2009–10 season between Aris and APOEL. In May 2010, he returned to Apollon for a third spell and retired at the end of the 2012–13 season.

Coaching career
After the departure of Pedro Emanuel from Apollon in December 2016, Sofronis Avgousti was assigned as caretaker manager for the remainder of the season. Due to the team's impressive form and performance, which resulted in the win of the Cypriot Cup, he stayed as a permanent solution for the managerial position at the club.

He left by mutual consent in November 2020 and, after AEK Larnaca dismissed their manager soon afterwards, Avgousti was appointed manager of that club on an 18-month contract. He and his staff left by mutual consent at the end of the 2020–21 season.

Managerial statistics

References

External links 
 

1977 births
Living people
Cypriot footballers
Cyprus international footballers
Association football goalkeepers
Apollon Limassol FC players
AEK Larnaca FC players
Aris Limassol FC players
APOEL FC players
Cypriot football managers
Apollon Limassol FC managers
AEK Larnaca FC managers
APOEL FC managers
Karmiotissa FC managers
AC Omonia managers